Yodeling Yokels is a 1931 one-reel short subject featuring Bosko; it is part of the Looney Tunes series. It was released in June 1931 and is directed by Hugh Harman and Rudolf Ising. The film score was composed by Frank Marsales.

Plot

Bosko wanders through an Alpine landscape to Honey's house. Once he reaches her house, the two venture out into the mountains while yodeling; however, Honey later becomes trapped on an iceberg flowing down the river, and Bosko must save her with the aid of two dogs. Meanwhile, a mouse sneaks out of its resident hole in the wall of Honey's home to play mini-golf, with a piece of Swiss cheese serving as the putting ground.

References

External links
 
 

1931 films
1931 animated films
1930s American animated films
1930s animated short films
Films scored by Frank Marsales
Films directed by Hugh Harman
Films directed by Rudolf Ising
Bosko films
Films set in Europe
Films set in the Alps
Looney Tunes shorts
Mountaineering films
American black-and-white films